Tommy Eichenberg is an American football linebacker for the Ohio State Buckeyes.

Early life and high school career
Eichenberg grew up in Cleveland, Ohio and attended Saint Ignatius High School. As a senior, Eichenberg was named first team All-Ohio after making 126 tackles with eight sacks, 23 tackles for loss, and five passes broken up. He initially committed to play college football at Boston College, but re-opened his recruitment during his senior year. Eichenberg ultimately signed to play at Ohio State over offers from Michigan, Michigan State, Iowa, and Kentucky.

College career
Eichenberg redshirted his true freshman year after playing in four games. Eichenberg was named a starter at linebacker entering his junior year. He finished the season second on the team with 64 tackles. Eichenberg was named the defensive MVP of the 2022 Rose Bowl after making 17 total tackles as Ohio State beat Utah 48-45.

Personal life
Eichenberg's older brother, Liam, played college football at Notre Dame and currently plays in the National Football League for the Miami Dolphins.

References

External links
Ohio State Buckeyes bio

Living people
Players of American football from Cleveland
American football linebackers
Ohio State Buckeyes football players
Year of birth missing (living people)